Leslie William Adlam (24 June 1897 – 1975) was an English professional footballer who played in the Football League for Cardiff City, Oldham Athletic and Queens Park Rangers. He began his career with non-League side Guildford United as a centre-forward before converting to a wing-half with Oldham where played more than 250 times.

Club career
Adlam was playing for non-league side Guildford United, Adlam as a centre-forward when he attracted the attention of Oldham Athletic who signed him for a club record fee of £300 in March 1923, beating off competition from Bristol Rovers. He soon converted to a right-hand and in eight seasons with Oldham, he made over 250 appearances in all competitions. He was granted a benefit match in April 1930 against Bristol City, guaranteeing him at least £500 from the fixture. He left the club in 1931, spending two years with Queens Park Rangers where he captained the side. He left Rangers in 1933 after failing to agree a new deal. He joined Third Division South side Cardiff City in December 1933. After sitting out the club's first match due to his fitness levels, he made his debut in a 3–1 defeat to Northampton Town on 23 December in place of John Duthie. He remained in the side for the three following matches, back-to-back games against Coventry City and a victory over Watford. However, the club's directors decided to release Adlam in the first week of January 1934.

Personal life
Born in Guildford, Adlam's father Robert worked as a railway guard. Before turning professional as a footballer, Adlam worked as a railway clerk. He married May Turner, a shop assistant, on 19 February 1924 in Glodwick, Lancashire.

References

English footballers
Guildford City F.C. players
Cardiff City F.C. players
Oldham Athletic A.F.C. players
Queens Park Rangers F.C. players
English Football League players
1897 births
1975 deaths
Sportspeople from Guildford
Farnham United Breweries F.C. players
Association football midfielders
Footballers from Surrey